The 38th Venice Biennale, held in 1978, was an exhibition of international contemporary art, with 26 participating nations. The Venice Biennale takes place biennially in Venice, Italy. No prizes were awarded this year or in any Biennale between 1968 and 1986.

References

Bibliography

Further reading 

 
 
 
 
 
 
 
 
 
 
 
 
 
 
 

1978 in art
1978 in Italy
Venice Biennale exhibitions